The 195th Fighter Squadron (195 FS) is a unit of the Arizona Air National Guard 162d Fighter Wing located at Tucson Air National Guard Base, Arizona. The 195th is equipped with the F-16 Fighting Falcon.

History

World War II
 see: 373d Fighter Group for expanded World War II history
Formed at Westover Field, Massachusetts in August 1943. During World War II the 410th Fighter Squadron was assigned to the European Theater of Operations (ETO), Ninth Air Force in Western Europe. It was equipped with P-47 Thunderbolts.

The 410th flew its first combat mission on 8 May 1944, a fighter sweep over Normandy. It then took part in preinvasion activities, e.g., escorting B-26 Marauders to attack airdromes, bridges and railroads in Occupied France. The squadron patrolled the air over the beachhead when the Allies launched the Normandy invasion on 6 June 1944, and hit troops, tanks, roads, fuel depots and other targets in the assault area until the end of the month.

The 410th moved to the Continent in July 1944 where it struck railroads, hangars, boxcars, warehouses and other objectives to prevent reinforcements from reaching the front at St. Lo, where the Allies broke through on 25 July 1944. The squadron bombed such targets as troops in the Falaise-Argentan area in August 1944. During the Battle of the Bulge, December 1944 – January 1945, the 410th concentrated on the destruction of bridges, marshalling yards and highways. It flew reconnaissance missions to support ground operations in the Rhine Valley in March 1945, hitting airfields, motor transports, etc. The squadron continued tactical air operations until 4 May 1945.

Returned to the United States and prepared for transfer to the Pacific Theater during the Summer of 1945, the Japanese Capitulation in August led to the squadron's inactivation in November 1945.

California Air National Guard

The wartime 410th Fighter Squadron was re-activated and re-designated as the 195th Fighter Squadron. It was allotted to the California Air National Guard, on 24 May 1946.  It was organized at Van Nuys Airport, California on 16 September 1946. The 195th Fighter Squadron was entitled to the history, honors, and colors of the 410th. The squadron was equipped with F-51D Mustangs and was assigned to the 146th Fighter Group, also at Van Nuys Airport by the National Guard Bureau.

As part of the Continental Air Command Fourth Air Force, the squadron trained for tactical fighter missions and air-to-air combat. The unit was called to active federal service on 1 March 1951 for duty in the Korean War.  Its parent 146th FG was transferred to Moody AFB, Georgia, where it trained pilots for Air Training Command.  The 195th FS, however, remained at Van Nuys Airport as part of the Air Defense Command 28th Air Division.  It was released from active duty and returned to California state control on 11 December 1952.

After the Korean War, the squadron was equipped with the long-range F-51H Mustang and remained a part of Air Defense Command, in February 1954, it was equipped with F-86A Sabre jet interceptors. By July 1955 the transition from the F-51H Mustang to the F-86A Sabre was complete. The squadron was re-designated a Fighter Interceptor unit with an air defense mission for the Los Angeles area.   During the 1950s, the squadron received newer F-86F Sabres in 1957 and later F-86H Sabre day interceptors in 1959.

In 1960, the 146th FIG was reassigned to Military Air Transport Service, trading in its Sabre interceptors for 4-engines C-97 Stratofreighter transports. With air transportation recognized as a critical wartime need, the 146th was re-designated the 146th Air Transport Wing (Heavy).   During the Berlin Crisis of 1961, both the Wing and squadron were federalized on 1 October 1961.  From Van Nuys, the 195th augmented MATS airlift capability worldwide in support of the Air Force’s needs.  It returned again to California state control on 31 August 1962.   Throughout the 1960s, the unit flew long-distance transport missions in support of Air Force requirements, frequently sending aircraft to Hawaii, Japan, the Philippines, and during the Vietnam War, to both South Vietnam, Okinawa and Thailand.

The C-97s were retired in 1970 and the unit was transferred to Tactical Air Command.  It transitioned to the C-130A Hercules theater transport, flying missions in support of TAC throughout the United States and Alaska.  In 1973 the C-130A models were transferred to the Republic of Vietnam Air Force and they were replaced by the C-130B.  During this period, both the 195th and its sister squadron, the 115th Tactical Airlift Squadron shared the same pool of aircraft.

With the end of the Vietnam War, the California National Guard bureau decided to downsize the 146th Tactical Airlift Wing.  With C-130s units being transferred to Military Airlift Command, the 195th TAS was inactivated on 30 September 1974.  Its personnel, equipment and aircraft of the 195th TFS were reassigned to the 115th TAS.

Arizona Air National Guard

In late 1983, the 195th designation was transferred from California to the Arizona Air National Guard.  It was formed in January 1984 as the 195 Tactical Fighter Training Squadron and was extended federal recognition on 1 February.  The mission of the unit was to train combat-ready pilots for the Air National Guard (Replacement Training Unit or RTU).  The 195th TFTS was the second of eventually four squadrons assigned to the 162d Tactical Fighter Training Group at Tucson ANGB.  It was equipped with the A-7D/K Corsair II. The squadron was the last of the RTUs in the A-7D aircraft.

Conversion from the A-7D/K started in 1991 when the 195th FS started to receive many older F-16A Block 5 aircraft from other USAF units.  This mission remained after the conversion, but the older airframes were not quite suited to fulfill this mission. However, this transition was quite short-lived since the squadron had to disperse its airframes already a year later. With the A-7Ds being retired in 1992, the squadron became a strictly ground academic squadron with no aircraft assigned at the time.

During the same period the ANG started with training foreign non-NATO pilots. Six aircraft from the 148th FTS were designated to begin a school for those students. This group of aircraft and an initial cadre of instructors formed what would later become IMT (International Military Training). The squadron had no official number or designation.  In 1995 the ANG Staff decided to transfer this school into the 195th TFTS. Thus the squadron regained its aircraft and started flying again. This time these airframes were all F-16A block 15 models, giving the squadron a better opportunity in its task.

In 2006 the squadron started converting to F-16C block 25 airframes. As one of the last F-16A block 15 airframe squadrons within the ANG and the USAF all together, it was decided to mothball the latter completely. Therefore, the squadron started receiving newer block 25 airframes that were becoming available from other squadrons. The mission of the squadron stayed exactly the same, just being able to perform in a more modern manner with the added capabilities of the block 25 aircraft.

Lineage

 Constituted 410th Fighter Squadron on 25 May 1943
 Activated on 15 August 1943
 Inactivated on 7 November 1945
 Re-designated: 195th Fighter Squadron, and allotted to California ANG on 24 May 1946.
 Extended federal recognition and activated on 16 September 1946
 Federalized and placed on active duty, 1 March 1951
 Released from active duty and returned to California state control, 11 December 1952
 Re-designated: 195th Fighter-Bomber Squadron, 1 January 1953
 Re-designated: 195th Fighter-Interceptor Squadron, 1 July 1955
 Re-designated: 195th Air Transport Squadron, 1 October 1961
 Federalized and placed on active duty, 1 October 1961
 Released from active duty and returned to California state control, 31 August 1962
 Re-designated: 195th Military Airlift Squadron, 8 January 1966
 Re-designated: 195th Tactical Airlift Squadron, 1 April 1970
 Inactivated on 30 September 1974
 195th Tactical Airlift Squadron withdrawn from California ANG, 1983 (Remained inactive)
 195th Tactical Airlift Squadron allotted to Arizona ANG, re-designated: 195th Tactical Fighter Training Squadron on 1 January 1984
 Extended federal recognition and activated on 1 February 1984
 Re-designated: 195th Fighter Squadron, 16 March 1992

Assignments
 373d Fighter Group, 15 Aug 1943 – 7 Nov 1945
 146th Fighter Group, 16 September 1946
 146th Composite Wing, 1 October 1950
 27th Air Division, Air Defense Command, 1 March 1951
 146th Fighter Wing, 1 January 1953
 146th Fighter-Interceptor Wing, 1 July 1955
 146th Air Transport Wing, 1 October 1961
 146th Military Airlift Wing, 8 January 1966
 146th Tactical Airlift Wing, 1 April 1970 – 30 September 1974
 162d Tactical Fighter Group, 1 February 1984
 162d Fighter Group, 16 March 1992
 162d Operations Group, 1 October 1995 – Present

Stations

 Westover Field, Massachusetts, 15 August 1943
 Norfolk Airport, Virginia, 23 October 1943
 Richmond Army Air Base, Virginia, 15 February – 15 March 1944
 RAF Woodchurch (AAF-419), England, 4 April – 4 July 1944
 Tour-en-Bessin Airfield (A-13), France, 19 July 1944
 Saint James Airfield (A-29), France, 19 August 1944
 Reims/Champagne Airfield (A-62), France, 19 September 1944
 Le Culot Airfield (A-89), Belgium, 22 October 1944
 Venlo Airfield (Y-55), Netherlands, 11 March 1945
 Lippstadt Airfield (Y-98), Germany, 20 April 1945

 AAF Station Illesheim, Germany, 20 May–July 1945
 Sioux Falls Army Air Field, South Dakota, 4 August 1945
 Seymour Johnson Field, North Carolina, 20 August 1945
 Mitchel Field, New York, 28 September – 7 November 1945
 Van Nuys Airport, California, 16 September 1946 – 31 January 1948; 1 March 1948 – 30 September 1974
 Lockheed Air Terminal, Burbank, California, 1–29 February 1948
 Tucson International Airport, Arizona, 1 February 1984
 Designated: Tucson Air National Guard Base, Arizona, 1991–Present

Aircraft

 P-47 Thunderbolt, 1943–1945
 F-51D Mustang, 1946–1953
 F-86A Sabre, 1953–1957
 F-86F Sabre, 1957–1959
 F-86H Sabre, 1959–1961
 C-97C Stratofreighter, 1961–1970

 C-130A Hercules, 1970–1973
 C-130B Hercules, 1973–1974
 A-7D/K Corsair II, 1984–1992
 F-16A Block 5 Fighting Falcon, 1991–1992
 F-16A Block 15 Fighting Falcon, 1995–2006
 F-16C Block 25 Fighting Falcon, 2006–Present

References

 Van Nuys Airport Army Air Force Base Unit and  Air National Guard Site
 Rogers, B. (2006). United States Air Force Unit Designations Since 1978. 
 
 195th Fighter Squadron@f-16.net

External links

Squadrons of the United States Air National Guard
Fighter squadrons of the United States Air Force
Military units and formations in Arizona